Cantando por un Sueño (literally "Singing for a dream") is a former segment inside the Argentine television program Showmatch, and now an independent TV show broadcast on El Trece.

On the contest, a non-celebrity "dreamer" (man or woman) who in addition must be a professional singer, is accompanied by a celebrity for some weeks of a singing competition. The couples are awarded points by a panel of judges, who give scores from 1 to 10, and those with the fewer points have to face the public vote to continue in the program.

As of May 2012, the show is in its fourth season and the panel of judges continues to include icons of the Argentine musical industry: Valeria Lynch, Óscar Mediavilla and Patricia Sosa.
Journalist Marcelo Polino, who also serves as a judge in Bailando por un Sueño and Soñando por Bailar, is part of the panel of judges too.

Airing of the show

Judges

 Full time judge
 Temporary/Guest judge

Seasons

Cantando 2006

Concursants

Couples

A total of 45 celebrities have appeared in the three seasons of Cantando por un Sueño. For each season, the celebrities are paired with a professional singer as a partner and a coach who instructs helps them with the song's choice and the work during the week. A total of 45 professional singers as the partners have appeared alongside celebrities.

List of the current professional partners

Alejandro Gallo
Antonella Cirillo
Augusto Buccafusco
Bruno Coccia
Carla del Huerto
Cristian Sergio
Facundo Magrane
Florencia Anca
Francisco Eizaguirre
Inbal Comedi
Jessica Abouchain
Juan Persico
Lautaro Rodriguez
Leandro Bassano
Luciana Rosenthal
Manuel Victoria
Mariano Zito
Melina de Piano
Michel Hersch
Nell Valenti
Pablo Turturiello

Notes

External links
  El Trece's Showmatch website

Argentine variety television shows